Is There Still Sex in the City? is a novel written by Candace Bushnell and published in August 2019 by Grove Press. It is based on Bushnell's real-life experiences after divorcing at the age of 50. The title of the book references Sex and the City, a book by Bushnell first published in 1997.

Plot
This book focuses on a new set of characters: Sassy, Kitty, Queenie, Tilda Tia and Marilyn. The book follows the women as they experience mid-life dating and relationships in the 21st century, occurring between a fictional place called "The Village" (based on the real life Hamptons) and Manhattan. This includes adoration from a younger man, experimenting with the dating scene on Tinder, and other explorations.

References

External links

Publisher's web page for this book

2019 American novels
Autobiographical novels
Grove Press books
Novels by Candace Bushnell